Patrick Doherty (born 6 February 1959) is an Irish Traveller who is a former bare-knuckle boxer. He is best known as one of the stars of My Big Fat Gypsy Wedding and Danny Dyer's Deadliest Men. He won Celebrity Big Brother 8. He appeared in When Paddy Met Sally in January 2012 and on Celebrity Bainisteoir later that year.

Early life
Doherty was born to Irish Traveller parents and moved around Manchester as a child and also to various sites in and around Birmingham. He did not attend school. His grandparents posed as his parents in his younger years but when he became a teenager he was sent to live with his "sister" and her family; his "sister" was actually his mother but as she was unmarried it was kept quiet to avoid shame on the family.

Career

My Big Fat Gypsy Wedding
Doherty was one of the Irish Travellers interviewed for the documentary My Big Fat Gypsy Wedding.

Celebrity Big Brother
On 18 August 2011, Doherty was the third person to enter the Celebrity Big Brother 8 house. He won the series, beating Kerry Katona at the final stage.

Doherty made an appearance on The Late Late Show in September 2011. He spoke about his experience on Big Brother, and his unexpected victory.  He also spoke about his personal life and the loss of his son, Patrick. Before that, Doherty appeared on ITV's This Morning.

When Paddy Met Sally
Doherty appeared in a two-part Channel 5 documentary with his former Big Brother housemate Sally Bercow, wife of the Speaker of the House of Commons. Bercow moved 
into Doherty's chalet on his Queensferry travellers' site, living by his rules in episode one and hers in episode two. When Paddy Met Sally aired in January 2012.

Celebrity Bainisteoir
In 2012, Doherty appeared on Celebrity Bainisteoir.

Gypsy Kids: Our Secret World
In 2016  Doherty appeared in this Channel 5 series about Traveller life from the children's perspective. He talked about the importance of staying on in education for his community. He appeared on This Morning alongside his granddaughter, 8-year-old Margaret, to debate this issue.

Dan and Paddy’s Bucket list-Kyushu Japan

Doherty explored Kyushu and partook in challenges along the way with his co-host, Daniel Coll.

The Truth About Traveller Crime
In 2020, Doherty took part in the controversial Channel 4 programme The Truth About Traveller Crime. The programme received complaints which led to an Ofcom investigation. Twelve months later, the investigation was still ongoing with Ofcom blaming the complexity of the case for the delays.

Personal life

Doherty encourages his grandchildren to remain in education.

Doherty was hospitalised after becoming infected with COVID-19 in January 2021.

References

1959 births
20th-century British people
21st-century British people
Living people
Reality show winners
Irish Travellers from England
People from Salford
Irish Travellers